Idun Reiten (born 1 January 1942) is a Norwegian professor of mathematics. She is considered to be one of Norway's greatest mathematicians today.

Career
She took her PhD degree at the University of Illinois in 1971. She was appointed as a professor at the University of Trondheim in 1982, now named the Norwegian University of Science and Technology.

Her research area is representation theory for Artinian algebras, commutative algebra, and homological algebra. Her work with Maurice Auslander now forms the part of the study of Artinian algebras known as Auslander–Reiten theory.

Awards
In 2007, Reiten was awarded the Möbius prize. In 2009 she was awarded Fridtjof Nansen's award for successful researchers, (in the field of mathematics and the natural sciences), and the "Nansen medal for outstanding research.

In 2007, she was elected a foreign member of the Royal Swedish Academy of Sciences. She is also a member of the Norwegian Academy of Science and Letters, the Royal Norwegian Society of Sciences and Letters, and Academia Europaea.

In 2012, she became a fellow of the American Mathematical Society. She was named MSRI Clay Senior Scholar and Simons Professor for 2012-13.

She delivered the Emmy Noether Lecture at the International Congress of Mathematicians (ICM) in 2010 in Hyderabad and was an Invited Speaker at the ICM in 1998 in Berlin.

In 2014, the Norwegian King appointed Reiten as commander of the Order of St. Olav "for her work as a mathematician".

See also
 Krull–Schmidt category

References

External links

 
Publikasjonsliste
 Publication List at the Mathematical Reviews

1942 births
Living people
University of Illinois Urbana-Champaign alumni
Academic staff of the Norwegian University of Science and Technology
Norwegian women mathematicians
20th-century Norwegian mathematicians
21st-century Norwegian mathematicians
Algebraists
Fellows of the American Mathematical Society
Members of the Norwegian Academy of Science and Letters
Royal Norwegian Society of Sciences and Letters
Members of the Royal Swedish Academy of Sciences
Members of Academia Europaea
Norwegian women academics
Scientists from Trondheim
20th-century women mathematicians
21st-century women mathematicians
20th-century Norwegian women scientists